RN-9 National Highway is a national highway in the center of Djibouti. At 123 km long, it is the second longest highway in Djibouti, after the National Highway 1.

References

Roads in Djibouti